This is a list of philosophers of language.

 Virgil Aldrich
 William Alston
 G. E. M. Anscombe
 Karl-Otto Apel
  Saint Thomas Aquinas, OP
 Aristotle
 J. L. Austin
 Alfred Jules Ayer
 Joxe Azurmendi
 Jody Azzouni
 Kent Bach
 Ingeborg Bachmann
 Archie J. Bahm
 Yehoshua Bar-Hillel
 Walter Benjamin
 Jonathan Bennett
 Henri Bergson
 Max Black
 Paul Boghossian
 Andrea Bonomi
 Jacques Bouveresse
 F. H. Bradley
 Robert Brandom
 Berit Brogaard
  Cardinal Thomas Cajetan, OP
 Herman Cappelen
 Rudolf Carnap
 Hector-Neri Castañeda
 Stanley Cavell
 Melchiorre Cesarotti
 David Chalmers
 Cheung Kam Ching
 Noam Chomsky
 Alonzo Church
 Nino Cocchiarella
 James F. Conant
 William Crathorn
 Donald Davidson
 Arda Denkel
 Michael Devitt
 Keith Donnellan
 William C. Dowling
 César Chesneau Dumarsais
 Michael Dummett
 David Efird
 S. Morris Engel
 John Etchemendy
 Gareth Evans
 Kit Fine
 Dagfinn Føllesdal
 Gottlob Frege
 Marilyn Frye
 Robert Maximilian de Gaynesford
 Peter Geach
 Alexander George
 Allan Gibbard
 Gongsun Long
 Nelson Goodman
 Paul Grice
 Jeroen Groenendijk
 Samuel Guttenplan
 Þorsteinn Gylfason
 Susan Haack
 Jürgen Habermas
 Peter Hacker
 Ian Hacking
 Axel Hägerström
 Bob Hale
 Oswald Hanfling
 Gilbert Harman
 John Hawthorne
 Jaakko Hintikka
 William Hirstein
 Richard Hönigswald
 Jennifer Hornsby
 Paul Horwich
 Wilhelm von Humboldt
 Carrie Ichikawa Jenkins
 David Kaplan
 Jerrold Katz
 Saul Kripke
 Mark Lance
 Stephen Laurence
 Ernest Lepore
 David Kellogg Lewis
 John Locke
 Béatrice Longuenesse
 Paul Lorenzen
 William Lycan
 John McDowell
 Colin McGinn
 Merab Mamardashvili
 Ruth Barcan Marcus
 José Medina
 Maurice Merleau-Ponty
 John Stuart Mill
 Ruth Millikan
 Richard Montague
 Charles W. Morris
 Adam Morton
 Stephen Neale
 William of Ockham
 Jesús Padilla Gálvez
 Peter Pagin
 L.A. Paul
 Charles Sanders Peirce
 Carlo Penco
 John Perry
 Gualtiero Piccinini
 Steven Pinker
 Plato
 Hilary Putnam
 Willard Van Orman Quine
 Adolf Reinach
 Denise Riley
 Richard Rorty
 Roscellinus
 Jay Rosenberg
 Bertrand Russell's views on philosophy
 Bertrand Russell
 Gilbert Ryle
 Robert Rynasiewicz
 Mark Sainsbury
 Nathan Salmon
 Stephen Schiffer
 Duns Scotus
 John Searle
 Susanna Siegel
 Brian Skyrms
 Quentin Smith
 Scott Soames
 David Sosa
 Robert Stalnaker
 Jason Stanley
  John of St. Thomas, OP (John Poinsot)
 Jaun Elia
 Stephen Yablo
 P. F. Strawson
 Alfred Tarski
 Kenneth Allen Taylor
 Ernst Tugendhat
 Michael Tye
 Zeno Vendler
 Vācaspati Miśra
 Friedrich Waismann
 Brian Weatherson
 Michael Williams
 Timothy Williamson
 John Wisdom
 Ludwig Wittgenstein
 Crispin Wright
 Georg Henrik von Wright
 Edward N. Zalta
 Eddy Zemach
 Paul Ziff
 Dean Zimmerman

 
Language